The 2009 European Judo Championships were held at the Sports Palace, in Tbilisi, Georgia, from 24 to 26 April 2009.

Medal overview

Men

Women

Medal table

Results overview

Men

−60 kg

−66 kg

−73 kg

−81 kg

−90 kg

−100 kg

+100 kg

Women

−48 kg

−52 kg

−57 kg

−63 kg

−70 kg

−78 kg

+78 kg

References

External links
 
 Video footage at JudoVision.org

 
E
2009 in Georgian sport
European Judo Championships
Sports competitions in Tbilisi
2000s in Tbilisi
European 2009
International sports competitions hosted by Georgia (country)
European Judo Championships